The Great Lola is a 1954 West German comedy film directed by Hans Deppe and starring Herta Staal, Wolf Albach-Retty and Grethe Weiser. The film's sets were designed by the art directors Willi Herrmann and Heinrich Weidemann.

Cast
 Herta Staal as Lola Cornero
 Wolf Albach-Retty as Carlo Werner
 Grethe Weiser as Nelly
 Walter Giller as Dr. Hugo Bendler
 Paul Dahlke as Emil Dornwald
 Käthe Haack as Agathe Dornwald
 Wera Frydtberg as Tilly
 Rudolf Platte as Jackson
 Rolf Arco
 Das Cornell-Trio as Singer
 Joe Furtner
 Horst Gentzen
 Friedel Hardt as Dolly
 Ruth Nimbach
 Die Novalis as Singers
 Marina Ried as Irene de Lorme
 Sunshine Quartett as Themselves, Singer
 Fritz Wagner
 Die Waldos as Singers

See also
 Fabulous Lola (1927)

References

Bibliography 
 Hans-Michael Bock and Tim Bergfelder. The Concise Cinegraph: An Encyclopedia of German Cinema. Berghahn Books, 2009.

External links 
 

1954 films
West German films
German musical comedy films
1954 musical comedy films
1950s German-language films
Films directed by Hans Deppe
German films based on plays
Remakes of German films
Sound film remakes of silent films
German black-and-white films
1950s German films